One Life, One Death is the 11th album by Buck-Tick and their first on BMG/Funhouse, released on September 20, 2000. The title comes from lyrics to "Cyborg Dolly: Sora-mimi: Phantom", which also mentions cloning sheep and is named after the famous Dolly. It reached number eleven on the Oricon chart with 30,170 copies sold. Starting from this album, Hisashi Imai started using computers when composing and he stated that he struggled to produce the sound he imagined.

Track listing

Personnel

Buck-Tick 
 Atsushi Sakurai - vocal
 Hisashi Imai - electric guitar, vocal
 Hidehiko Hoshino - rhythm guitar
 Yutaka Higuchi - bass guitar
 Toll Yagami - drums

Additional musicians
 Kazutoshi Yokoyama - manipulation, keyboard
 Katsushige Okazaki - sampler

References 

Buck-Tick albums
2000 albums
Japanese-language albums
Industrial rock albums